St Patrick's Grammar School, Armagh, is a Roman Catholic boys' non-selective voluntary grammar school in the city of Armagh, Northern Ireland. The present-day school was officially opened on Thursday, 27 October, 1988, by the late Cardinal Tomás Ó Fiaich, the then Chairman of the Board of Governors, and was the result of the amalgamation of two of Northern Ireland's oldest grammar schools, Christian Brothers' Grammar School and St. Patrick's College, both of which had traditions stretching back as far as the 1830s.

The school once again went through an expansion in 2014-2015, this time with the closure of St. Brigid's High School. The school moved away from academic selection with immediate effect, leaving St Patrick's the last Catholic Grammar School to abandon academic selection in the Armagh and Craigavon area, after St Michael's Lurgan ended academic selection after amalgamating with two other schools in Lurgan.

Enrollment at St. Patrick's was expanded to 1250 to facilitate the closure and a £3 million site renovations began in October 2015 to enhance facilities. Construction concluded in June 2017. St Patrick's is to undergo further expansion as part of the School Enhancement Programme.

History of St. Patrick's

St Patrick's College
St Patrick's College, Armagh, was established as a junior seminary on Armagh's Sandy Hill by Archbishop Crolly and was under the direction of diocesan priests until 1861, when the Vincentian Order was invited to take charge of the school. The Vincentians continued their apostolate in Armagh until the amalgamation.

Christian Brothers' Grammar School
The Irish Christian Brothers arrived in Armagh in 1851 at the invitation of Archbishop Cullen, who was later to be Ireland's first Cardinal. Within a few years the Christian Brothers acquired the Greenpark site and primary and secondary schools were established. Christian Brothers' Grammar School, Greenpark, built up a strong academic and sporting tradition. When the Vincentian Order signified their intention to withdraw from Armagh, the late Cardinal Tomas O' Fiaich requested the Irish Christian Brothers to become joint trustees of the new amalgamated school. The work in education started by Archbishop Crolly in 1838 was to continue on Sandy Hill. Cardinal O' Fiaich was succeeded as Chairman of the Board of Governors by Cardinal Daly in 1991, by Cardinal Brady in 1997 and by Mr. Frank Corvan.

St. Patrick's Grammar School
In 1988, St Patrick's Grammar School was established after St Patrick's College and Christian Brothers Greenpark amalgamated to form the new school. Br. L. Kelly, Headmaster of St. Mary's Grammar School Belfast, was appointed as the first Headmaster of the new school. He was ably assisted by James McKeown, Damien Woods, Paul McAvinchey, Seamus Savage and Frank Corvan.Br. Kelly retired in 1999 and took up a teaching post with an American university. In 1999 the long boarding tradition in St Patrick's ended after the Vincentian Order left Armagh. In 2016, Fr. Kevin Donaghy announced his retirement as Headmaster of St. Patrick's after 17 years in the post. He is the last Catholic Priest Headmaster in Northern Ireland and the last priest on staff in St Patrick's. Fr. Donaghy oversaw many changes at St Patrick's including overseeing the last St Patrick's team to win the MacRory Cup in 1999/2000, the new music and technology block being added in 2003, the renovation work carried out in 2015-2017 and more recently the amalgamation with St Brigid's High School in 2015. Mr. Dominic Clarke of the Sacred Heart College in Omagh and past pupil was appointed the first lay Headmaster in the 180-year history of St Patrick's for the 2016/2017 academic year. Fr. Peter Clarke was appointed the first school chaplain in 17 years for the academic year of 2016/17. Mr Jim Herron retired as Vice-principal in June 2017 alongside past pupil and School Bursar Michael Bradley. Mr Damien McAlary, Head of Sixth Form, was promoted to Vice-Principal for the start of the 2017/18 academic year and Head of Year 13 Mr Philip Coyle being appointed as a Senior Teacher and Head of Sixth Form for 2017/18. In 2017, St Patrick's Grammar launched a school app which in time will become the main source of information between the school and parents. It keeps pupils, parents, ex pupils and teachers informed about school information.

Site renovation
The school was awarded £4 million for site renovation in October 2013  to include an extension to the school canteen and school meals kitchen, new home economics classrooms, an extension to facilitate a relocated staff room and refurbishment of classrooms, PE departments and general schools buildings as well as permission for 4 mobile classrooms. The contract was awarded to GEDA construction and they began work on site in October 2015 with work finishing in June 2017.
St Patrick's again received funding for additional renovation work in May 2018.

Life at St. Patrick's

Languages
At St. Patrick's all students from years 8-10 study languages and most student will go on to study languages at GCSE and A-level. 
There are three languages offered at St. Patrick's,
Irish
French
Spanish
In years 8-9 all students study French and Irish, with the top ability students also studying Spanish as a third language in Year 10. Students will have up to two hours a week for each language. At GCSE, most students go on to study at least one language with some students availing of the opportunity to take more than one. Also, at A-level some students choose to continue studying a language further. These students usually have eight classes per week, alongside two conversation classes with the school's language assistants. Students from St Catherine's College study French and Spanish at St Patrick's. Every language at St. Patrick's has a fluent language assistant.

Students who speak a first language other than English are often entered for a GCSE in their first language in order to maximise the number of GCSEs they achieve.

Extra-curricular activities
Some extra-curricular societies of the school include the debating society, St. Vincent De Paul and groups of the music department.

Extra-curricular groups in the music department include the school orchestra, steel band, traditional group, and choir, each of which has a day allocated for practice for one hour after school. The department takes part in the new 'Soundstart Project.' Every year 8 and year 9 class are part of this. For one class every week they learn an orchestral instrument from all sections of the orchestra, as well as African drums. They are taken by professional tutors, assuring that every pupil can leave year 9 able to play an instrument and read music.

The music groups play an annual spring concert in the Market Place Theatre, along all the groups from Soundstart. The main music groups also tour around the country. The steel band has performed in places like the Waterfront Hall as well as playing on radio shows. The band has participated in competitions in Jamaica and Spain. The orchestra and traditional group have also toured in Spain. The choir sings regularly in mass services and competitions.

Sports department
Sports include basketball, cross-country running, Gaelic football, golf, handball, hurling, squash and swimming. The school hosts an annual sports day towards the end of each academic year.

In 1923 the headmaster of St Patricks and St Macartans Monaghan held a Gaelic match between the two schools and where later joined by St Patrick's Cavan, St Columb's Derry, St Malachy's Belfast, and St Colman's Newry. The Macrory Cup was originally open to boarding schools, but in 1954, Abbey CBS became the first day school to win the cup. St Patricks dominated the Cup in the earlier years winning the cup from 1923–29, 1931, 1944–47 and 1953. After a 47-year wait, St Patricks won the cup in 2000. St Patricks have won the Macrory Cup 14 times second only to St Colman's Newry. In 2007, 2012 and 2017 the school reached the semi-final stage of the MacRory Cup. In 1934, 1936, 1938, 1943, 1950–1952, 1957, 1967, 1994 and 1997 the school reached the final of the Gaelic football competition. The school was the first winner of the All-Ireland Colleges competition the Hogan Cup.

Excursions
It has been traditional for first year students to attend a residential retreat (typically Killowen, Carlingford or Todd's Leap) at the beginning of their academic life at St. Patrick's. At the end of a student's seven years at St. Patrick's they are invited to attend a religious retreat and the school's annual formal.

The school's language department has developed links with European countries to facilitate exchange programs. The school's Irish department promotes Gaeltachts to the Irish language students throughout KS3, GCSE and A Level.

The Physical Education department took a group of students to Canada.

School Aid Romania (SAR)
School Aid Romania was set up in 1990 with two main aims: to assist children in need in Romania and to bring together pupils from schools and  communities in Northern Ireland. School Aid Romania's objectives are to contribute to the development of community relations and mutual understanding between young people in Northern Ireland and to secure, by joint ventures, material assistance to relieve poverty and improve the well-being of young people in Romania. The staff who accompany students to Romania are Mrs U. Lennon and Mr N. King. Irish TV visited the school in January 2016 to interview Year 14 students who visited Romania in 2015.

St. Patrick's Grammar has been involved in SAR since 1993 and travels to Brasov with Cookstown High School. The school has hosted visitors from schools, hospitals, orphanages and the Inspectorate in Brasov. The SAR group in St. Patrick's has arranged for physiotherapists and teachers of special needs to travel to Brasov and work with children in Timis.

Amalgamation with St Brigid's
It was announced in March 2014 that St. Patrick's was to merge with St Brigid's High School Armagh as the Armagh school was set for closure.  This allowed all Catholic boys to attend St. Patrick's, which from September 2014 no longer used academic selection. St. Patrick's is now an all-ability school which accepts all young boys from Armagh and surrounding areas regardless of academic ability. This is to provide students with the best possible education and increase opportunities to study a range of subjects at GCSE to meet the qualification reforms for Northern Ireland.

Academic achievements
Students of St. Patrick's have achieved exemplary public examination results with pupils often attaining recognition for achieving top grades in Northern Ireland and the United Kingdom. Pupils of Mr. Gerard Cullen (Head of Business Studies & Economics) have on four occasions managed to attain the best GCSE score in the subject in Northern Ireland along with a second and third at GCSE, a first, third and sixth at A-Level, and a litany of other related awards.

During summer 2006 exam season students at St. Patrick's achieved exemplary results in their GCSE and A-Level subjects, making it the top all boys grammar school in Northern Ireland and fifth overall.

Summer 2008 heralded further success for St. Patrick's with twenty-seven of its students attaining straight As in three or more A-Levels. Five students achieved four grade As, whilst one student attained five.

In 2016 St. Patrick's Grammar School was named the top all boys Grammar school in the North according to A level results.

The history department has also garnered recent successes. In the 2016 results one pupil Eamon Livingstone, gained third in A-Level history in Northern Ireland,  student of Mrs Julianne Denvir and Mrs Elaine Murphy. The same academic year, the journalism department also had successes. Conor Finn gained 2nd in A-Level journalism in Northern Ireland, pupil of Mrs Shauna Clements and Mrs Maria Rafferty.

Notable alumni

References

Grammar schools in County Armagh
Catholic secondary schools in Northern Ireland
Armagh (city)
Boys' schools in Northern Ireland
Educational institutions established in 1988
1988 establishments in Northern Ireland